Börü may refer to several places:

 Börü, Azerbaijan (Erməni Borisi), a village in Goranboy District
 Börü, Kyrgyzstan, a village in Osh Region

See also
Boru (disambiguation)